Odenwald – Tauber is an electoral constituency (German: Wahlkreis) represented in the Bundestag. It elects one member via first-past-the-post voting. Under the current constituency numbering system, it is designated as constituency 276. It is located in northern Baden-Württemberg, comprising the districts of Main-Tauber-Kreis and Neckar-Odenwald-Kreis.

Odenwald – Tauber was created for the inaugural 1949 federal election. Since 2021, it has been represented by Nina Warken of the Christian Democratic Union (CDU).

Geography
Odenwald – Tauber is located in northern Baden-Württemberg. As of the 2021 federal election, it comprises the districts of Main-Tauber-Kreis and Neckar-Odenwald-Kreis.

History
Odenwald – Tauber was created in 1949, then known as Tauberbischofsheim. It acquired its current name in the 1980 election. In the 1949 election, it was Württemberg-Baden Landesbezirk Baden constituency 8 in the number system. In the 1953 through 1961 elections, it was number 182. In the 1965 through 1976 elections, it was number 185. In the 1980 through 1998 elections, it was number 181. In the 2002 and 2005 elections, it was number 277. Since the 2009 election, it has been number 276.

Originally, the constituency comprised the districts of Tauberbischofsheim and Buchen. In the 1965 through 1976 elections, it comprised the districts of Tauberbischofsheim, Buchen, and Mosbach. It acquired its current borders in the 1980 election.

Members
The constituency has been held continuously by the Christian Democratic Union (CDU) since its creation. It was first represented by Oskar Wacker from 1949 to 1957, followed by August Berberich from 1957 to 1969. Karl Miltner was representative from 1969 to 1990. Siegfried Hornung then served from 1990 to 2002. He was succeeded by Kurt Segner from 2002 to 2009. Alois Gerig was elected in 2009, and re-elected in 2013 and 2017. He was succeeded by Nina Warken in 2021.

Election results

2021 election

2017 election

2013 election

2009 election

Notes

References

Federal electoral districts in Baden-Württemberg
1949 establishments in West Germany
Constituencies established in 1949
Main-Tauber-Kreis
Neckar-Odenwald-Kreis